Matthew Lightner is the former executive chef of Atera in New York City, a recipient of two Michelin stars. In 2010, Lightner was named one of the "Best New Chefs in America" by Food & Wine.

Career
Lightner was born in Norfolk, Nebraska in 1980. Lightner graduated with high honors from Portland's Western Culinary Institute in 2001.  He trained at Noma in Copenhagen, Denmark until 2009, before moving back to the U.S.

In 2009, he began working at Castagna in Portland, Oregon. He returned to Portland in 2018.

See also
List of Michelin starred restaurants

References

External links
Atera

Living people
Head chefs of Michelin starred restaurants
1980 births
American chefs
American male chefs
People from Norfolk, Nebraska